A drunk tank is a jail cell or facility accommodating people who are intoxicated.

Drunk Tank also may refer to:
Drunk Tank (band), a former Chicago noise rock group
 Drunk Tank (album)
 (The) Drunk Tank, former name for the Rooster Teeth Podcast

See also
Dunk tank